Line 6 of the Wuhan Metro was opened on 28 December 2016. It is the fifth line of the Wuhan Metro to be opened since its creation. A 7-km extension to the line opened on 26 December 2021.

The northern end of the line is  station in Dongxihu District. The southern end of the line is  station in Caidian District.

History

Stations

Rolling Stock

References

 
Railway lines opened in 2016
2016 establishments in China